Jérôme Ferrari is a French writer and translator born in 1968 in Paris. He won the 2012 Prix Goncourt for his novel Le Sermon sur la chute de Rome ("The Sermon on the Fall of Rome").

Ferrari has lived in Corsica and taught philosophy at the Lycée international Alexandre-Dumas in Algiers for several years, then at the Lycée Fesch of Ajaccio.

Currently, he is professor of philosophy at the French School of Abu Dhabi.

Several of his novels have been translated into English, including Where I Left My Soul (2012), which is "set in the mid-1950s during the Algerian war, looking backwards to the second world war and the French defeat in Indochina, and forwards to the collapse in 1958 of the Fourth Republic."

Most recently, his novel In His Own Image was published in English translation by Europa Editions.

Works 
 

 2018 A son image(English translation: In His Own Image, 2022)
 2015 Le Principe (English translation: The Principle, 2016)
 2012 Le Sermon sur la chute de Rome (English translation: The Sermon on the Fall of Rome, 2014)
 2010 Où j'ai laissé mon âme (English translation: Where I Left My Soul, 2012)
 2009 Un dieu un animal
 2008 Balco Atlantico (English translation: Balco Atlantico, 2019)
 2007 Dans le secret
 2002 Aleph zéro

Awards and honors 
 2012 Prix Goncourt, Le Sermon sur la chute de Rome
 2010 Grand Prix Poncetton, Où j'ai laissé mon âme 
 2010 Prix Roman France Télévisions, Où j'ai laissé mon âme
 2009 Prix Landerneau, Un dieu un animal

References 

1968 births
Living people
Writers from Paris
20th-century French novelists
21st-century French novelists
French schoolteachers
Prix Goncourt winners
Prix Valery Larbaud winners
French male novelists
20th-century French male writers
21st-century French male writers
French translators
Emirati schoolteachers